Souhardya De (born 2004) is an Indian writer, columnist, and podcaster, from Midnapore, West Bengal. He is a columnist for the Sunday Guardian and a recipient of the Pradhan Mantri Rashtriya Bal Puraskar, a civilian award for Indian citizens under the age of 18, in 2021.

Personal life 
De pursued high school studies at Vidyasagar Shishu Niketan in Midnapore, West Bengal, graduating in July, 2022. His father, Shakti Prasad De is an assistant professor of History at the Midnapore College and his mother Jayati De is as a teacher at a government school, in West Bengal.

Career 
He is a columnist for the Sunday Guardian and a podcaster, hosting a show called Cosmographia: The Graeco Romans, the Egyptians and Us. In 2021, Souhardya was one of the recipients of the PM-YUVA Fellowship, a stipend for young authors writing about the Indian independence movement, announced by the Ministry of Education. His book 'Pratap Jung: The Ultimate Sacrifice' was published by the National Book Trust as part of the PM-YUVA series published in 2023.

Bibliography 
 2017 - 
 2019 - 
 2023 -

Honours and awards 
 Inducted to the Science Olympiad Foundation Hall of Fame in 2019.
 Nominated for the 2020 International Children's Peace Prize from the KidsRights Foundation in Amsterdam, for his educational philanthropy.
 Pradhan Mantri Rashtriya Bal Puraskar by the Ministry of Women and Child Development, Government of India in 2021.

References

External links 

 

2004 births
Living people
Indian male writers
Indian columnists